Grevillea argyrophylla, the silvery-leaved grevillea, is a species of flowering plant in the family Proteaceae and is endemic to the south-west of Western Australia. It is an erect, sometimes low-lying shrub with egg-shaped leaves with the narrower end towards the base, and white flowers, sometimes tinged with pink.

Description

Taxonomy
Grevillea argyrophylla was first formally described in 1855 by Carl Meissner in Hooker's Journal of Botany and Kew Garden Miscellany, from material collected by James Drummond. The specific epithet (argyrophylla) means "silvery-leaved".

Distribution and habitat
Silvery-leaved grevillea grows in heath and shrubland over limestone or sandstone in near-coastal areas from the Murchison River to Dandaragan and Jurien Bay in the Avon Wheatbelt, Geraldton Sandplains and Yalgoo biogeographic regions of south-western Western Australia.

Conservation status
This grevilles is listed as "not threatened" by the Government of Western Australia Department of Biodiversity, Conservation and Attractions.

References

argyrophylla
Endemic flora of Western Australia
Eudicots of Western Australia
Proteales of Australia
Taxa named by Carl Meissner
Plants described in 1855